Bhudia is a surname. Notable people with the surname include:

Amit Bhudia (born 1980), Kenyan cricketer
Rajesh Bhudia (born 1984), Kenyan cricketer
Sachin Bhudia (born 1998), Kenyan cricketer